Clinton–Washington Avenues station may refer to:
Clinton–Washington Avenues station (IND Crosstown Line)
Clinton–Washington Avenues station (IND Fulton Street Line)